Lake Suturuokha is a freshwater lake in the Sakha Republic, Russia. It lies in the middle course area of the Indigirka River, to the west of it.  Administratively the lake is part of Aby District (Aby Ulus)

Geography
The lake is located in the Aby Lowland —part of the wider East Siberian Lowland, by the southeastern slopes of the Polousny Range, a short distance to the west of Lake Ozhogino. Suturuokha village lies to the southeast of the lake. It is one of the three largest lakes of the 15,000 Aby Lakes. There is an island formed by stones in the central area of the lake which has become a nesting site for birds. 

The lake is frozen between late September and June. The Suturuokha River, a right hand tributary of the Indigirka, flows from the southern shore of the lake.

See also
List of lakes of Russia

References

External links
Suturuokha Lake - Lakes of Russia
Fishing in Lake Suturuokha - YouTube
Lake Ecosystem
Geographical places in Sakha (Yakutiya), Russia
Suturuokha
East Siberian Lowland